Zoteux is a commune in the Pas-de-Calais department in the Hauts-de-France region of France.

Geography
Zoteux is located 16 miles (26 km) northeast of Montreuil-sur-Mer, on the D343 road.

Population

Places of interest
 The church of St. Pierre, dating from the fifteenth century.
 The Louis XVI château.

See also
Communes of the Pas-de-Calais department

References

Communes of Pas-de-Calais